The Delaware City Refinery, currently owned by Delaware City Refining Corporation, a subsidiary of PBF Energy, is an oil refinery in Delaware City, Delaware.

The refinery was commissioned in 1956 and Getty Oil operated it up until 1984, when Texaco bought Getty. In 1988, Star Enterprises, a company started when Saudi Aramco bought half interest, took over the refinery until 1998, when Motiva Enterprises, a joint venture between Star (Saudi Aramco) and Shell, operated it. Motiva's operation was the most controversial, with many lawsuits resulting from an explosion and many federal emission regulations violations. Premcor Refining Group bought the refinery from Motiva in 2004, but Valero acquired Premcor a year later.

On 20 November 2009, the refinery was shut down permanently as part of cost-cutting measures by Valero Energy Corporation. Anticipated economic impacts of the closure include major reductions in tax revenue and retail sales for Delaware City, increased materials acquisition cost for petroleum products re-sellers and an increase to consumer gasoline prices in the longer term.

On 25 January 2010, Petroplus, the largest independent refining company in Europe, announced its interest in buying the refinery.

In June 2010, it was announced that the Delaware City Refinery was purchased by PBF Energy Partners for $220 million. The refinery was expected to reopen in Spring 2011.

PBF Energy announced that the restart of the refinery was completed successfully on 7 October 2011. The refinery processes heavy sour crude.

References

Energy infrastructure completed in 1956
Delaware City, Delaware
Oil refineries in the United States
Energy infrastructure in Delaware
Buildings and structures in New Castle County, Delaware